Windeck is a municipality in the Rhein-Sieg district, in North Rhine-Westphalia, Germany. It is situated on the river Sieg, approx. 35 km east of Bonn and 35 km west of Siegen. The name Windeck comes from the Windeck castle ruins and the nearby village of Windeck.

The community of Windeck was formed in 1969 through the merger of the communities of Dattenfeld, Herchen and Rosdorf. Today Windeck consists of 58 villages and some hamlets and homesteads. The most important are:

Population figures as of March 31, 2019

Other villages are Oppertzau, Dreisel, Werfen, Stromberg and Au an der Sieg.

In Windeck, the Leina company produces first aid kits and warning triangles.

Notable people

 Andy Borg (born 1960), percussionist and presenter, lived briefly in Herchen
 Renan Demirkan (born 1955), actress and author, lives in Windeck
 Hanns Dieter Hüsch (1925–2005), cabaret artist, lived in Werfen
 Peter Praet (born 1949 in Herchen), Belgian economist and central banker
 Jonas Reckermann (born 1979), beach volleyball player
 August Sander (1876–1964), photographer, lived in Kuchhausen

References